River Park may refer to:

  River Park (Fresno, California), shopping center in Fresno, California
  River Park (Bratislava), multifunction center on the Danube bank in Bratislava
  River Park Sporting, Soccer team in Sacramento, California